Harlem Avenue is a major north–south street located in Chicago and its west, southwest, and northwest suburbs. It stretches from Glenview Road in Glenview to the intersection of East South Street and South Drecksler Road in Peotone, where it diverges into Illinois Route 50. At , it is the third-longest street in the United States, after Telegraph Road in southeastern Michigan and O Street in Nebraska. For most of its length, it carries Illinois Route 43. There is a stop along the Metra's BNSF Line at Harlem Avenue and Windsor Avenue in Berwyn, Illinois. There is also a major transit center where Metra's UP West Line and the Chicago Transit Authority Green Line share a facility in Oak Park, Illinois. The northern terminus of Harlem Avenue is also nearby the Glenview station for both Metra's Milwaukee District/North Line and Amtrak intercity trains.

Communities served
From north to south:
Glenview (suburb)
Morton Grove (suburb)
Niles (suburb)
Park Ridge (suburb)
Edison Park (Chicago neighborhood)
Norwood Park (Chicago neighborhood)
Harwood Heights (suburb)
Norridge (suburb)
Dunning (Chicago neighborhood)
Montclare (Chicago neighborhood)
Elmwood Park (suburb)
Austin (Chicago neighborhood)
River Forest (suburb)
Oak Park (suburb)
Forest Park (suburb)
Berwyn (suburb)
North Riverside (suburb)
Riverside (suburb)
Lyons (suburb)
Stickney (suburb)
Forest View (suburb)
Garfield Ridge (Chicago neighborhood)
Clearing (Chicago neighborhood)
Summit (suburb)
Bedford Park (suburb)
Bridgeview (suburb)
Burbank (suburb)
Oak Lawn (suburb)
Chicago Ridge (suburb)
Worth (suburb)
Palos Heights (suburb)
Orland Park (suburb)
Tinley Park (suburb)
Matteson (suburb)
Frankfort (suburb)
Monee (suburb)

Major intersections

See also

References

Streets in Chicago